The Joint European Union Intelligence School (JEIS) is a project of the Permanent Structured Cooperation (PESCO) that was announced in November 2018. The project will be led by Cyprus and Greece. The school will provide education and training in intelligence disciplines, among other things, to EU member states intelligence personnel, and develop new hardware, including drones and electronic warfare technology.

See also

NATO Centres of Excellence
Five Eyes
NATO Defense College
NATO School
European Centre of Excellence for Countering Hybrid Threats
Common Security and Defence Policy
Permanent Structured Cooperation
European Security and Defence College
European External Action Service
European Union Intelligence and Situation Centre
Club de Berne
European Union Institute for Security Studies
European Union Satellite Centre
Intelligence College in Europe

References

External links

Intelligence
International military schools
Intelligence education